Tamazouzte is a small town and rural commune in 
Al Haouz Province of the Marrakech-Tensift-Al Haouz region of Morocco. At the time of the 2004 census, the commune had a total population of 12,245 people living in 1,943 households.

References

Populated places in Al Haouz Province
Rural communes of Marrakesh-Safi